T-Systems International GmbH (T-Systems) is an internationally operating service provider for information technologies and digital transformation. The company is part of Deutsche Telekom AG and is headquartered in Frankfurt am Main.

As of 2012, T-Systems was the largest German and one of the largest European IT services companies, serving customers such as WestLB, Old Mutual, Daimler, Volkswagen, Royal Dutch Shell, Sanlam, Murray & Roberts, BP, TUI AG, De Agostini, Philips, MAN SE, Airbus, E.ON. and British American Tobacco.
The company operates in more than 20 countries and in 2015 employed 45,990 people, in 2003 were approximately 50,000 people worldwide, among them around 27,000 in Germany and 23,000 outside. Beginning in December 2007 Reinhard Clemens was the CEO. Before that, he had been president of EDS (now HP Enterprise Services) Germany since 2003. Since January 2018 Adel Al-Saleh has been the CEO of T-Systems.

In June 2018, T-Systems announced it will cut 10,000 jobs in 3 years, including 6,000 in Germany, with the hope of returning the company to profitability.

History

T-Systems was founded in 2000, when Deutsche Telekom acquired a 50.1% stake of debis Systemhaus, one of the largest IT services companies in Germany at the time. Most of Deutsche Telekom's existing service and IT businesses were then merged and incorporated under the control of one single company, the newly founded T-Systems. In 2001 T-System's headquarters were moved from Bonn to Frankfurt. In 2002 the remaining 49.9% share of debis Systemhaus was acquired and fully incorporated into T-Systems.

However, the company underwent a leadership crisis during the first years after its creation, due to different agendas of the former debis management and the leadership of the former Telekom subsidiaries. Since then, T-Systems made a number of acquisitions, most notably the purchase of gedas, the IT subsidiary of Volkswagen Group in December 2005. From 2007 to 2018, Reinhard Clemens was T-Systems' CEO. T-Systems also supported the creation of Silicon Saxony, a major IT cluster in Germany.

In 2008 T-Systems and the Cognizant global IT services provider entered into a global alliance. T-Systems' India operations were taken over by Cognizant following this alliance in late March 2008. T-Systems is also working for the German government and a market leader in Germany.

In 2009, T-Systems came with another wing in India (T-Systems ICT India Pvt. Ltd.) to support its global partners. T-Systems ICT India has its head office in Pune and have set up another 'Point of Production' in Bangalore in April 2016 and is expanding to provide its ICT services also to global customers of T-Systems International. Since January 2022, Anant Padmanabhan is the managing director of T-Systems ICT India. Before that, Laszlo Posset managed the company's Indian operations.

In 2020, T-Systems employed more than 28,000 people in 20 countries and generated annual sales of EUR 4.2 billion.

International subsidiaries 

T-Systems has different International Subsidiaries such as:
 T-Systems Austria GesmbH (Austria)
 T-Systems Belgium NV (Belgium)
  T-Systems do Brasil Ltda (Brasil)
 TSI Finnland (Finland)
 T-Systems France SAS (France)
 T-Systems Information and Communication Technology E.P.E. (Greece)
 Deutsche Telekom IT Solutions Hungary (Hungary)
 T-Systems Spring Italia srl (Italy)
 T-Systems Luxembourg S.A. (Luxembourg)
 T-Systems MMS (Germany: Software Division)
 T-Systems Sdn. Bhd (Malaysia)
 T-Systems México S.A. de C.V. (Mexico)
 T-Systems Nederland B.V. (Netherlands)
 T-Systems Nordic TC A/S (Nordics)
 T-Systems North America, Inc (USA and Canada)
 T-Systems Polska Sp.z o.o. (Poland)
 T-Systems ICT Romania S.R.L. (Romania)
 T-Systems CIS (Russia)
 T-Systems Singapore Pte Ltd (Singapore)
 Deutsche Telekom Systems Solutions Slovakia s.r.o.  (Slovakia)
 T-Systems South Africa (Pty) Ltd. (South Africa)
 T-Systems ITC Iberia, S.A (Spain and Portugal)
 T-Systems Schweiz AG (Switzerland)
 T-Systems Telekomünikasyon Limited Sirketi (Turkey)
 T-Systems ICT India Pvt. Ltd. (India)

References

External links 
 T-Systems home page

Deutsche Telekom
ICT service providers
Information technology consulting firms of Germany
International information technology consulting firms
Cloud computing providers
Companies based in Frankfurt
Companies established in 2000